The 2007 New Zealand Grand Prix was an open wheel racing car race held at Teretonga Park, near Invercargill on 11 March 2007.

It was the fifty second New Zealand Grand Prix and was open to Toyota Racing Series cars (based on international Formula 3 regulations). The event was also the third race of the seventh round of the 2006–07 Toyota Racing Series.

Classification

Qualifying

Grand Prix

References

External links
 Toyota Racing Series

New Zealand Grand Prix
Gra
Toyota Racing Series